The 1998 Baseball World Cup (BWC) was the 33rd international Men's amateur baseball tournament. The tournament was sanctioned by the International Baseball Federation, which titled it the Amateur World Series from the 1938 tournament through the 1986 AWS. The tournament was held, for the third time, in Italy, from July 21 to August 2. The final was a repeat of the previous BWC tournament, with Cuba again defeating South Korea in the final, winning its 22nd title.

There were 16 participating countries, split into two groups, with the first four of each group qualifying for the finals.

This was the first edition of the tournament that allowed professional players to take part in the competition.

The next six competitions were also held as the BWC tournament, which was replaced in 2015 by the quadrennial WBSC Premier12.

Stadiums
Stadio Steno Borghese
Stadio Primo Nebiolo

First round

Pool A

Pool B

Final round

Final standings

Awards

References

External links
XXXIII Baseball World Cup - XXXIII Copa del Mundo de Béisbol
Mens: World Cup 1998 at Sports123.com

World Cup
Baseball World Cup
1998
1998 in Italian sport
July 1998 sports events in Europe
August 1998 sports events in Europe
Sports competitions in Messina